Invasion Iowa is a television series that aired on Spike TV beginning on March 29, 2005, on ITV4 beginning on November 3, 2005, and The Comedy Channel in April 2007.

Premise 
The series depicts events from September 2004, in which William Shatner played a hoax on the small town of Riverside, Iowa, by claiming to film a science fiction movie there. Unbeknownst to the residents of Riverside, the movie was in fact fake, a satire on the genre. In front of and behind the cameras, Shatner and his purported entourage performed a parody of Hollywood and celebrity culture. Producers designed the various plots and gags to elicit reactions from the townspeople. Shatner played the part of the eccentric star and improvisational actors were hired as members of his entourage.

Production 
Producers chose Riverside because it is the self-proclaimed future birthplace of Shatner's most enduring character, Captain James T. Kirk. Residents of Riverside were encouraged to audition for parts in the movie and take jobs on its crew.

Invasion Iowa was created by Rhett Reese and Paul Wernick, who also created Spike TV's earlier "reality parody" series, The Joe Schmo Show, and its sequel, Joe Schmo 2.

Release 
In May 2009, the series was released as a two-disc region-1 DVD set.

Cast 

 William Shatner as himself
 Desi Lydic as Disintegratrix 3000
 Ernie Grunwald as Steve Cook

External links

Critic Doctor

Spike (TV network) original programming
2000s American mockumentary television series
2000s American reality television series
2000s American parody television series
2005 American television series debuts
2005 American television series endings
Reality television series parodies
Television series about television
Television series by GRB Entertainment
Television shows set in Iowa
Washington County, Iowa